was a professional actor, singer, stand-up comedian, and film producer. Also known by his nickname "Fanfan", he was born in Nice, France, to a Japanese father, Minoru Okada, who was an artist, and a Danish mother, Ingeborg Sevaldsen, who was the sister of Eline Eriksen, the model for the "Mermaid of Copenhagen". Masumi Okada was the younger of two sons; his older brother, Taibi "Erick" Okada, was also an actor and presenter- known professionally as E. H. Eric, he was the emcee for the Beatles' 1966 concert in Tokyo.

Biography
Masumi Okada spent the first four years of his life in France before relocating to Japan in 1939. He received his education under his Western name, Otto Sevaldsen, at Saint Joseph International School (SJIS) in the city of Yokohama in Kanagawa prefecture, graduating in 1955. In 1952, while still a student at SJIS, Okada debuted as an actor in a musical at the Nichigeki Music Hall. He signed with Nikkatsu Corporation in 1954, appearing in his first film, "Hatsukoi Kanariya Musume"/"Canary Girl's First Love", the following year.

In 1956, Okada was cast as the bandmaster in Takumi Furukawa and Shintaro Ishihara's "Taiyo no Kisetsu"/"Season of the Sun". This performance led to his appearance in the companion film, "Kurutta Kajitsu"/"Crazed Fruit" (1956), in which he played the cool, laid-back, finger-snapping Amerasian, "Frank Hirosawa", the unofficial leader of a band of young "rebels without a cause". Okada allegedly stole every scene in which he appeared.

In a career which spanned more than five decades, Okada went on to appear in over 140 films. A talented and versatile entertainer, he was also active on stage and television. His credits include all genres in the three media—from stage musicals to horror films, from comedies to historicals to tragedies, and from Shakespeare to science-fiction.

Okada's mixed ethnicity and proficiency in Japanese, English and French enabled him to portray a wide range of characters, in roles as diverse as "Count Dracula" in "The Vampire Dracula Comes To Kobe" (1979) to "Brother Michael" in James Clavell's "Shogun" (1980). He acted as the French physicist, "Dr. Jules Masson", in Ishiro Honda's "Latitude Zero"/"Ido Zero Daisakusen"/"Atragon II" (1969). In the film, "Marco" (1973), he was the Chinese ambassador, "Ti Wai". In "Bye-Bye, Jupiter"/"Sayonara, Jupiter" (1984), he was cast as "Dr. Mohammed Mansur", and in "Getting Any?" (1994) -- a comedy with "Beat" Takeshi Kitano—Okada made a cameo appearance as the Russian leader, Joseph Vissarionovich Stalin.
Okada's film credits also included "Arashi wo yobu otoko"/"Man Who Causes a Storm" (1957), "Akai hatoba"/"Red Quay" (1958), "Ankoku no Ryoken"/"Passport to Darkness" (1959), "Yoru no nagare"/"Evening Storm" (1960), "Oneechan wa tsuiteru ze"/"Anything Goes Three Dolls' Way" (1960), "Kyuketsu Dokurosen"/"Living Skeleton" (1968), "Moeru Tairiku"/"The Blazing Continent" (1968), "Isoge! Wakamono: Tomorrow Never Waits"/"Hurry, Young Ones! Tomorrow Never Waits" (1974), "Hishu monogatari"/"A Tale of Sorrow and Sadness" (1977), "Fuku no hana"/"Winter's Flower" (1978), "Umi to dokuyaku"/"The Sea and Poison" (1986), "CF Garu"/"Commercial Film Girl" (1989), "The Hunted" (1995), "Izo" (2004) and "Shiberia Chotokkyu 5"/"Siberia Express 5" (2005).

Okada's other contributions to the film industry include his role as a producer for both "Battle Royale" (2000) and "Battle Royale II: Requiem" (2003), as well as "Chichan wa sokyu no muko" (date of release: January 19, 2008). He was also the executive producer of "Blue" (2002), a critically acclaimed film about the relationship between two schoolgirls involved in a lesbian crush.

Okada's stage credits include the Toho musicals, in which he starred after leaving Nikkatsu Corporation, as well as the French musical, "La Cage aux Folles", which ran for over 400 performances. In 2001, he appeared as the French philosopher and writer, Voltaire, in a Japanese-language version of the operetta, "Candide", by Leonard Bernstein, the composer of "West Side Story" (1957).

Okada also founded the theater company, Gekidan Keyaki, in Japan.

In 1962, Okada appeared in NHK's "Wakai Kisetsu". In 1966, Masumi Okada was cast as the newspaper reporter, "Ito Mura" in Osamu Tezuka's television series, "The Space Giants" (aka "Ambassador Magma", "Space Avenger" and "Monsters From Outer Space"), produced by P Productions and directed by Hidehito Ueda. Okada also starred in the 1980s series, "Miracle Girl", a Japanese television detective drama, and the 1998 series, "Nemureru Mori"/"A Sleeping Forest". In the Tunnels' 1988 parody, "Kamen Norida", Okada played Joker's "Colonel Fanfan".
Okada's performances were not restricted to Japanese audiences. "The Space Giants", "Latitude Zero", "Marco", "Shogun" and "The Hunted" were some of his credits which became international hits, and brought him into contact with actors such as Joseph Cotten, Richard Jaeckel and Cesar Romero ("Latitude Zero"), Desi Arnaz Jr. and Zero Mostel ("Marco"), Richard Chamberlain and John Rhys-Davies ("Shogun") and Christopher Lambert ("The Hunted").

Okada was a regular judge in the "Iron Chef" series, and the host-presenter for many Japanese variety and game shows, including NTV's celebrity quiz show, "Sarujie". In "Sarujie", he wore a monkey suit and make-up, in line with the theme of the show -- "saru" translates into "monkey", and, "jie"/"chie", "wit", the term "sarujie" meaning "shallow cunning". Okada was an exceptional Master of Ceremonies, and was the emcee for many beauty pageants held in Japan. For over two decades, he served as the host-presenter for The International Beauty Pageant, popularly known as the Miss International contest. Tall (5 ft. 11 inches / 1.82 metres), good-looking, charming, charismatic, suave and witty, with his affectionate personality and magnetism, he could always liven up a show, regardless of its audience and the other participants in the show. Again, his ability to speak fluent Japanese, English and French proved to be an asset, as were his powerful, deep and sensuous vocals.

Masumi Okada was appointed as one of Japan's Ambassadors to the Hans Christian Andersen 2005 bicentenary, a list of events organized in celebration of the nineteenth-century Danish author's life and works. Okada said of Andersen: "To the future Andersen: Why? Why? Why? There were many "whys" during my childhood. And although the years have passed there are still many things I do not understand, but that makes life fascinating. The passion of asking "why" is called "curiosity". I have heard that Andersen's father read many stories to Andersen when he was a child. A book is a magical thing, and once you turn the pages, you can travel and experience many things. For example, you can fly, talk to flowers and animals, and even live under water. I am sure that Andersen's inspiration and his eternal message of "Love, Courage, Hope and Dream" grew from his father's storytelling. Anyone who harbours the curiosity to read books is himself a potential future Andersen."

Okada was married three times. In 1960, he announced his two-year "contractual marriage" to the renowned dancer and mime choreographer, Mamako Yoneyama—a union which ended even before the first year was over. Okada then remained single for over a decade; in 1972, he married Japanese actress Midori Fujita, with whom he had three sons, the eldest of whom, Yoshihiro Okada Makoto, is currently an actor and DJ in Japan. 22 years later, Okada divorced Fujita, and, in 1995, at the age of 60 years, he took his third wife, Keiko Yarita, a 34-year-old flight stewardess, who gave him his fourth child, a daughter named Tomomi, in 1998.

The turn of the millennium brought two tragic deaths in Okada's life. In 2000, his elder brother, Taibi, died of Parkinson's Disease in Sprecklesville, Maui Island, Hawaii. Then, on July 27, 2004, Okada's third son with Fujita was found hanged at his mother's home in the Denenchofu suburb of Tokyo. Shocked, Okada did not attend his son's private funeral the following day, but called a press conference a month later to refute allegations by the Shuukan Josei magazine that there had been bad blood between him and his 26-year-old son, who was an assistant stage designer with a theater company prior to his suicide. Okada said at the press conference, "I don't know why. It's been hard ....... and so sad when the child dies before the parent."

Masumi Okada devoted his entire life to the entertainment industry and never retired from show business. In June 2005, he was diagnosed with throat (esophageal) cancer, and underwent surgery. Less than three months later, he was again in front of the cameras, hosting the Miss International 2005 beauty pageant in Tokyo, although his fatigue surfaced towards the end of the show when he apparently read out the names of the top 12 contestants—Miss Venezuela, Miss Philippines, Miss Brazil, Miss Japan, Miss Dominican Republic, Miss Colombia, Miss Turkey, Miss Finland, Miss France, Miss Ukraine, Miss Peru and Miss Serbia and Montenegro—in the space of 20 seconds. Nevertheless, the show was a huge success, with wide media coverage.

Okada suffered a relapse of his malignancy and was re-hospitalized, but succumbed to his illness at a Tokyo hospital on May 29, 2006.

Selected filmography

 Hatsukoi kanariya musume (1955) - Shinkichi
 Midori harukani (1955) - Prince of Moon
 Haru no yo no dekigoto (1955) - Tomio (Tommy)
 Ginza 24 chou (1955) - Mineo Akaishi
 Taiyo no kisetsu (1956) - Bandmaster
 Crazed Fruit (1956) - Hirosawa Frank
 Hungry Soul, Part II (1956)
 Gyûnyû ya Furankî (1956)
 Okinawa no Tami (1956)
 Otemba san'nin shimai: Odoru taiyô (1957) - Tetsuo Izumi
 Watashi wa zenkamono de aru (1957)
 Madamu (1957)
 Nikutai no hankô (1957) - Billy
 Sun in the Last Days of the Shogunate (幕末太陽伝 Bakumatsu taiyōden) (1957) - Kisuke
 Frankie Bûchan no zoku aa gunkaki: Nyogo ga-shima funsenki (1957)
 Arashi wo Yobu Otoko (1957) - Shinsuke, Miyako's brother
 Tokyo yaro to onna-domo (1958)
 Yoru no kiba (1958) - Santa, a pickpocket
 Yogiri no dai-ni kokudô (1958) - Sidney Oka
 Shundeini (1958) - Kenkichi Hiranuma
 Haneda hatsu 7 ji 50 pun (1958) - Shinji Baba
 Akai hatoba (1958) - Taabô
 Kanzenna yûgi (1958) - Kazu Tomita
 Akai lamp no shûressha (1958) - Nakamura kun
 Kanzen na asobî (1958)
 Chî no gâmpeki (1958)
 Kurutta datsugoku (1959) - Kunio Iwakami
 Kenjû 0 gô (1959) - Eric
 Ankoku no ryoken (1959)
 Dynamite ni hi o tsukero (1959) - Jirô Sugi
 Uwaki no kisetsu (1959)
 Kaze no aru michi (1959) - Hideo Mayama
 Umi no wanâ (1959)
 Nirenjû no tetsu (1959)
 Hatoba no muho mono (1959)
 Fudôtoku kyôiku kôza (1959) - Tatsuya Oka
 Kyanpasu hyakutoban: Yori gakusei yaro to masume tachi (1960)
 Roku-san-sei gurentai (1960) - Jumpei Kanzaki
 Datô - Knock Down (1960) - Gorô Nakahara
 Ore wa ginza no ki e itai (1960) - McLane
 Yoru no nagare (1960) - English Teacher
 Tenka no Kaidanji Tosshin Tarô (1960)
 Nankai no noroshi (1960) - Tsujii
 Oneechan wa tsuiteru ze (1960) - Yasuo Taki
 Kuchibue ga nagareru minato machi (1960)
 Taiheiyo no katsugiboshi (1961) - Andy Shirai
 Kigeki: Tonkatsu ichidai (1963) - Marius
 Palembang kishû sakusen (1963)
 Kyojin Ôkuma Shigenobu (1963) - Satô
 Hibari, Chiemi, Izumi: Sannin yoreba (1964)
 Niji o tsukamu koibito tachi (1965)
 Yoake no uta (1965) - Nogami
 Shichinin no yajû (1967, part 1, 2)
 Kimi wa koibito (1967)
 Nippon ichi no otoko no naka no otoko (1967) - Toshio Okamoto
 Toshigoro (1968) - Yoshiharu Kokura
 The Living Skeleton (1968) - Father(Akashi) / Tanuma
 Moeru tairiku (1968) - Kenneth
 Latitude Zero (1969) - Dr. Jules Masson
 Shin Abashiri Bangaichi: Fubuki no Hagure Okami (1970)
 Marco (1973) - Ti Wai
 Isoge! Wakamono (1974) - Nakahara
 A Tale of Sorrow and Sadness (1977)
 Fuyu no Hana (1978) - Shinkichi Mie
 Ashita no Jô 2 (1981) - Jose Mendosa (voice)
 Kagi (1983)
 Bye Bye Jupiter (1984) - Dr. Mohammed Mansur
 Tokei – Adieu l'hiver (1986)
 The Sea and Poison (1986) - Hattori
 Umi e (1988)
 Kaitô Ruby (1988)
 CF gâru (1989) - Kumazwa
 Peesuke: Gatapishi monogatari (1990)
 Jingi (1991)
 Itsuka dokokade (1992)
 Getting Any? (1995, cameo appearance) - Stalin
 The Hunted (1995) - Lt. Wadakura
 Ai Suru (1997) - professor
 Hakuchi (1999) - Head manager
 Siberian Express 5 (2003)
 IZO (2004)
 Shiberia Chôtokkyû 5 (2005) - Pietro Yoshida
 Damejin (2006)
 Waru: kanketsu-hen (2006) - (final film role)

Dubbing
Dracula (Count Dracula (Frank Langella))

References

External links
Ryuganji.net
Japan-zone.com

1935 births
2006 deaths
Deaths from esophageal cancer
People from Tokyo
Japanese male film actors
Japanese people of Danish descent
Deaths from cancer in Japan
French people of Japanese descent